The 2010 Dutch TT was the sixth round of the 2010 Grand Prix motorcycle racing season. It took place on the weekend of 24–26 June 2010 at the TT Circuit Assen.

MotoGP classification

Moto2 classification

125 cc classification

Championship standings after the race (MotoGP)
Below are the standings for the top five riders and constructors after round six has concluded.

Riders' Championship standings

Constructors' Championship standings

 Note: Only the top five positions are included for both sets of standings.

References

Dutch TT
Dutch
Tourist Trophy